Kim Se-hwang (born November 16, 1971) is a South Korean guitarist, singer-songwriter and arranger. In 1991, he formed Downtown, a rock group, and produced their self-titled debut album in 1993. He was a member of the rock band N.EX.T, which he joined in 1994, the metal band NovaSonic and the rock band 2Cell. In 2011, he produced the album Vivaldi: The Four Seasons, reinterpreting portions of The Four Seasons with an electric guitar. In 2014, he became the first Korean artist to have his guitar displayed in the Guitar Center store in Hollywood, at "Hollywood's RockWalk", a hall of fame honoring musical artists.

Life and career

Early life in the U.S.
Kim was born in South Korea and started playing guitar when he was 4 years old, with his first introduction from his mother who had been a classical guitarist. His father was a South Korean diplomat and the family was stationed in Washington, D.C. from 1974 to 1986. Although his mother gave up a professional career after marriage, she gave performances to represent South Korean culture at diplomatic parties, including the Smithsonian, and continued to teach and share classical music with him at home. She also liked 70's guitar music such as Santana and Jeff Beck and made music education a part of his childhood. He said he grew up in a family environment "filled with a desire for unification" because his father was from Hamhung, a city in North Korea, which helped him develop his personality as a musician who seeks a peaceful consensus.

He returned to South Korea in 1986, after twelve years in America, and started his career in the early nineties.

N.EX.T and other bands
He debuted with a rock band of his own called "Downtown" in 1991, with bassist Jung Han-jeong and drummer Lee Chang-hyun; and produced their album DOWNTOWN in 1993. In 1994, N.EX.T's lead singer and founder Shin Hae-chul met with him and invited him to join the band as a guitarist, and he was with them until they disbanded in early 1998. That year, 1998, he formed the metal band NovaSonic with two other N.EX.T members, Kim Seung-hwan and Lee Su-yong, joined by rapper Kim Jin-pyo; remaining with them until 2005. He rejoined N.EX.T, when they regrouped in 2005, and remained with them until 2012. Also, during N.EX.T's hiatus, he played in the rock band 2Cell; and performed on albums for all three bands.

Kim remembers favorite performances with N.EX.T, rehearsing at the Royal Albert Hall, performing concerts in South Korea with the Royal Philharmonic Orchestra and recording their 1997 album Lazenca (A Space Rock Opera) with the London Symphony Orchestra. He performed with the band again on August 8, 2015, for their last appearance at the Pentaport Rock Festival, along with other band members Kim Young-seok and Lee Su-yong, and other musicians, for a special memorial stage for their leader Shin, who died on October 27, 2014.

Performances and collaborations
He has performed and collaborated with musicians including Joe Lynn Turner and Deep Purple, Stuart Hamm, Scott Henderson, Guthrie Govan, Martin Taylor, Akira Jimbo, Steve Vai, Loudness, Lee Ritenour and Vinnie Moore.

He has also performed for and represented brands such as Orange Amp, Yamaha, Boss, Roland, D'Addario, Carvin, EMG, Tronical, Suhr Guitars and Gibson.

Classical music
He expanded his musical career with a crossover between rock and roll and classical music on June 23, 2011 with the release of his album Vivaldi: The Four Seasons with the Seoul Philharmonic Orchestra. He said he always liked Vivaldi's piece, which he often heard his mother play, as a child. He kept postponing playing it himself until his interest was revived in May 2010 when he performed a duet on the SBS program Stocking with electronic violinist Eugene Park, who also plays the Vivaldi piece. Then on October 24, 2010, he made his classical debut at Sejong Center for the Performing Arts when he performed "Winter" of "Four Seasons" with violin and cello. He described preparing for the album, practicing twelve hours a day, as passionate as a middle schooler learning guitar. He said he wanted to accommodate the differences in the sounds of the violin, which has no breaks, compared to the guitar. On the album he used his Suhr "Kim Se-hwang Modern Custom" guitar, provided for him by the company, to his specifications, after he joined them as a representative in 2010.

A year later, in June 2012, he performed Luis Bacalov's "Concerto Grosso" for I Musici's 60th Anniversary during their South Korean tour.

Television and public appearances
In addition to performing on musical programs, he appeared on television as a judge for KBS's 2012 Top Band Season 2 and MBC Music's 2014 Green Song Contest. In the fall of 2015 through January 2016, he was an original cast member of Knowing Bros, his debut performance in an entertainment show. The show's production team referred to him as "one of the three biggest guitarists in Asia" during one episode.

On August 9, 2012 he performed and served as an events judge with other musicians at the "Pyeongchang Special Music Festival" for mentally disabled musicians, in commemoration of the 2013 Special Olympics World Winter Games. And he served on the judging committee at the Ministry of Unification's music contest "Uni Music Race 2016 (UMR2016)".

Lectures and music education
He lectures on music and the philosophy of music and has been a practicing music instructor at Dongduk Women's University, faculty at Seoul Arts College (SAC); and as of 2016, current faculty at Kimpo University and Hanyang University's Social Education Center.

Style and influences
He has described his inspirations as a long list of "Guitar Gods" that increases daily, including Jimi Hendrix, Eric Clapton, Jeff Beck, Led Zeppelin, Deep Purple, AC/DC, Santana, B.B. King, Prince, Eddie Van Halen, Steve Lukather, Def Leppard, and more.

Guitarist Stuart Hamm compares his sound to Joe Satriani and Steve Vai.

Honors and awards
In 1997, he received an endorsement guitar, a sky-blue "P4 limited" from Washburn Guitars, which to his knowledge, was the first for a South Korean instrumentalist from a western company. He was the first Korean performer at the NAMM Show in Anaheim, California in 2013 In 2014, he donated his signature red Yamaha Pacifica Artist Custom "Kim Se Hwang" guitar for display at the Guitar Center store when he was inducted into "Hollywood's RockWalk", alongside those of guitarists Eddie Van Halen, Steve Lukather, Kirk Hammett and Slash, among others. In May 2014, he was the first Asian to receive an "Honorary Doctorate of Music in Performance" from the Musicians Institute in Hollywood. In May 2016, he was appointed as the first Korean artist to represent the guitar brand Gibson.

Personal
On January 12, 2008 he married Jeong Ae-Hwa, a twenty-eight-year old corporate designer, introduced by friends in 2000, and they have a daughter and son. On November 20, 2014, he performed in a parent's concert at his daughter's kindergarten.

Discography

Downtown
DOWNTOWN (1993)

NovaSonic
NOVASONIC (1999)
NOVASONIC 2 (2000)
NOVASONIC 3 (2001)
4th House Han (2003)

2Cell 
2Cell (2004)

Studio albums
Vivaldi: The Four Seasons (2011)

Singles
"Nostalgia" SM Station Season 2, with Jungmo (2016)
"DCT(Dreams Come True) feat. Simon Phillips, Stuart Hamm (2017)
"WE NEED A CHANGE" by Linah London (feat. Sehwang Kim, Karl Kula) (2018) (YouTube) → The song was ranked No.10 on the UK Pop Club Chart, Feb 15 2019.

Filmography

References

Living people
South Korean rock guitarists
Academic staff of Hanyang University
1971 births